Frederico Augusto Pieruccini "Freddy" Moojen (born February 25, 1983) is a soccer forward. Born in Brazil, he represented Canada at the international level in futsal. 

He shared the 2005 and 2006 Premier Development League goals lead.  He was also the 2006 PDL MVP and the 2006-2007 Major Indoor Soccer League Rookie of the Year. In 2012, 2013, 2014, 2015 and 2016 he was the PLSQ Golden Boot winner playing for the FC L'Assomption and Mont-Royal Outremont.

Moojen became a Canadian citizen in 2013, and has since appeared for the Canadian national futsal team.

Youth
Born in Balneário Camboriú, Brazil, in 1997 Moojen played for Coritiba Foot Ball Club’s youth team.  He was briefly with International FC in 2001 before signing with Avaí Futebol Clube, playing with them from 2001 to 2004.   Moojen attended Lincoln Memorial University where he was a two-time Gulf South Conference Player of the Year and a 2005 NCAA Division II third team All American.  He transferred to Clemson University where he played the 2006 NCAA Division I season.  In 2004, he played for the Cocoa Expos in the fourth division Premier Development League.  He returned to the Expos in 2005, scoring 18 goals tying him with Andy Metcalf as the league’s leading scorer. In 2006, Moojen played for the Augusta FireBall, sharing the goal scoring lead with John Cunliffe.  He was also the 2006 PDL MVP.

Professional
On January 25, 2007, the Montreal Impact of the USL First Division drafted Moojen.  He signed with the Impact on March 1, 2007 and played fourteen games for the Impact before suffering from a season-ending injury.  On April 21, 2008, he transferred from the Impact to the Minnesota Thunder in USL-1.  Moojen was released by Thunder in February 2009, during the off-season.

On August 28, 2007, he signed with the New Jersey Ironmen of the Major Indoor Soccer League after the Ironmen selected him in the second round (18th overall) in the MISL College Draft.  He was the 2007-2008 MISL Rookie of the Year.  The MISL collapsed at the end of the season and Moojen and his team mates moved to the newly created Xtreme Soccer League. Moojen, slowed by a toe injury played only seven games, scoring four goals, for the Ironmen before being traded to the Chicago Storm for Randi Patterson on January 31, 2009.

He then moved to Poland, where he played in the colors of GKP Gorzów Wielkopolski. In the following year he went to play in the first division in Thailand and Oman. In 2011–12 he played with the Wichita Wings in the MISL. In the summer of 2012 he played in the first professional league in Quebec, the Première Ligue de soccer du Québec, for the FC L'Assomption where he was the league's leading scorer ("Golden Boot") and third best player ("Bronze Ball"). In the winter of 2012–13 he played his second season for the Wichita Wings in the Major Indoor Soccer League where he was the team's captain and leading scorer with 27 goals in 24 games. In 2013, he played again for the FC L'Assomption where he was the team's captain and league's leading scorer for the second consecutive year. In late 2013, Frederico Moojen signed a contract with the Baltimore Blast in the MISL and played with them for one season before the league dissolved. 

He played outdoor for FC L'Assomption for his third consecutive season in the PLSQ. In late September 2014, Moojen signed a new indoor contract with the Dallas Sidekicks of the Major Arena Soccer League, scoring 41 goals in 20 games for the Sidekicks.  Moojen was part of the Canadian National Arena soccer team that played in the Indoor Soccer World Cup in March 2015 scoring 7 goals in 3 games for Canada.

In 2015, he signed with Montreal club Mont-Royal Outremont and was the Première Ligue de soccer du Québec top scorer for the fifth consecutive year. During the 2015/2016 winter he played for the St. Louis Ambush in the Major Arena Soccer League where he was named assistant coach/player scoring 10 goals in 12 games played. He became the first player to reach 100 career goals in the PLSQ.

In 2016, Moojen began playing for the Florida Tropics SC during the winter in the new Indoor Professional League in the United States as a player-assistant coach. On 27 June 2018, Moojen extended his contract with the Tropics through 2020. Moojen had been the team's captain since its inception and left the team with more appearances than any other player.

On 2 November 2017, Moojen signed with CS Longueuil.

On 17 January 2019, the Florida Tropics traded Moojen to Utica City FC in exchange for Andre Braithwaite.

International
Moojen was called by the Canadian National Futsal team to play in the 2016 CONCACAF Futsal Championship in Costa Rica. Moojen scored 5 goals in 3 games and was named the Top scorer of the tournament ( Golden Boot).

References

External links
 Florida Tropics SC player profile
 Minnesota Thunder player profile
 New Jersey Ironmen player profile

1983 births
Association football forwards
Augusta FireBall players
Avaí FC players
Baltimore Blast (2008–2014 MISL) players
Canadian expatriate soccer players
Canadian soccer players
Chicago Storm players
Clemson Tigers men's soccer players
Cocoa Expos players
Coritiba Foot Ball Club players
Dallas Sidekicks (PASL/MASL) players
Expatriate soccer players in Canada
Expatriate soccer players in the United States
Living people
Major Indoor Soccer League (2001–2008) players
Major Indoor Soccer League (2008–2014) players
Minnesota Thunder players
Montreal Impact (1992–2011) players
New Jersey Ironmen players
USL League Two players
USL First Division players
Wichita Wings (2011–2013 MISL) players
Xtreme Soccer League players
Major Arena Soccer League players
Première ligue de soccer du Québec players
Player-coaches
Florida Tropics SC players
Canadian men's futsal players
Utica City FC players
Major Arena Soccer League coaches
Canadian soccer coaches
Sportspeople from Santa Catarina (state)
CS Mont-Royal Outremont players
CS Longueuil players
FC L'Assomption players
Brazilian people of Dutch descent